= Robert Shelton Mackenzie =

Robert Shelton Mackenzie (nom-de-plume Sholto; 22 June 1809 – 30 November 1880) was an Irish and American miscellaneous writer.
